R. Sankar became the Chief Minister of Kerala when Pattom Thanupillai was appointed as Governor of Punjab State. He remained as the Chief Minister of Kerala from 26 September 1962 to 10 September 1964. He had to resign when a no-confidence motion was passed in the Assembly.

Congress party went through a split during this period. The resignation of P. T. Chacko from the R. Sankar Ministry had paved the way to the eventual formation of Kerala Congress. After his untimely death, the Chacko loyalists in the Congress party grouped together and formed the Kerala Congress under the leadership of K. M. George from Muvattupuzha with the blessings of Mannath Padmanabhan.

Council of Ministers

Vote of No-Confidence 
Home Minister in R. Shankar cabinet, P. T Chacko had to resign. This paved the way to frequent infighting in Congress party. After the death of P. T. Chacko in Aug 1964, K. M. George took the leadership of the dissident group in Congress. 15 Congress MLAs requested the Speaker of the House to be considered as a separate group under the Leadership of K. M. George and Deputy Leader R. Balakrishna Pillai. Subsequently, a no-confidence motion was presented in the assembly. After two days of discussion, the no-confidence motion passed 50 against 73 votes and R. Sankar resigned.

Dissidents from the Congress party subsequently formed a new party Kerala Congress

See also 
 List of chief ministers of Kerala
 Kerala Council of Ministers
 1960 Kerala Legislative Assembly election

References

 http://www.niyamasabha.org/codes/Ministers%20Book%20Final.pdf

Kerala ministries
Indian National Congress state ministries
Indian National Congress of Kerala
1962 establishments in Kerala
1964 disestablishments in India
Cabinets established in 1962
Cabinets disestablished in 1964